Kučkovo (Macedonian: Кучково) is a village in North Macedonia. It is part of the Ǵorče Petrov Municipality.

Demographics
As of the 2021 census, Kučkovo had 148 residents with the following ethnic composition:
Macedonians 107
Persons for whom data are taken from administrative sources 29
Others 12

According to the 2002 census, the village had a total of 138 inhabitants. Ethnic groups in the village include:
Macedonians 122
Serbs 1
Romani 15

References

Villages in Ǵorče Petrov Municipality